Ann A Lancaster (5 May 1920 – 31 October 1970) was a well-known character actress who appeared in many British films, television shows and in theatre.

Lancaster specialised in comic roles and had a talent for voices which she often used on radio to portray children and to do voiceovers for television commercials. Her most high-profile film roles were in The Million Pound Note (1953), A Night to Remember (1958, uncredited as a woman on a train), The Dirty Dozen (1967), Fathom (1967), The Railway Children (1970), and in one Carry On Film Carry On Again Doctor (1969). She was the voice behind the Ajax 'It cleans like a white tornado' advertisements on television. She was in the radio show: Mrs Dale's Diary, and appeared in many well-known television comedies including Hancock's Half Hour, Till Death Us Do Part, Tea at the Ritz, Hughie and The World of Beachcomber with Spike Milligan.

Personal life

Ann Lancaster was born in 1920 in London and died of cancer in 1970 in Paddington, London at the age of 50, before her last film (The Railway Children) was released.

Filmography

Cage of Gold (1950) .... Minor Role (uncredited)
The Magic Box (1951) .... Bridesmaid in wedding group
Judgment Deferred (1952) .... girl in shop. (uncredited)
The Secret People (1952) .... Manicurist  Secret People
The Card (1952) .... Miriam (uncredited)
Angels One Five (1952) .... W.A.A.F.
The Million Pound Note (1953) .... Doris (uncredited) 
A Night to Remember (1958) .... Mrs. Bull – Woman on Train (uncredited)
The Flesh and the Fiends (1960) .... Minuet Dancer (uncredited)
The Durant Affair (1962)
The Lamp in Assassin Mews (1962) .... Mrs. Dowling
I've Gotta Horse (1965) .... Woman Shopkeeper a.k.a. Wonderful Day
The Secret of My Success (1965) .... Angela Pringle
Bunny Lake Is Missing (1965) .... Grocer's Assistant
Three Bites of the Apple (1967) .... Winnifred Batterfly 
The Dirty Dozen (1967) .... chief prostitute (uncredited)
Fathom (1967) .... Mrs. Trivers
The Window Cleaner (1968) .... Mother
Inadmissible Evidence (1968) .... Drinking Club Hostess
Hot Millions (1968) .... Pendleton's Landlady (uncredited) 
Decline and Fall... of a Birdwatcher (1968) .... Mrs. Grimes
Till Death Us Do Part (1968) .... Woman at Block of Flats
Journey to Midnight (1968) .... Red Queen (episode 'Poor Butterfly')
A Nice Girl Like Me (1969) .... Miss Garland
Carry On Again Doctor (1969) .... Miss Armitage
Rhubarb (1969) .... Mrs. Rhubarb
The Railway Children (1970) .... Ruth

TV

The Vise (1 episode, 1959) .... Fat Lady
... a.k.a. Detective's Diary (USA: rerun title)
... a.k.a. Saber of London (UK)
... a.k.a. The Vise: Mark Saber (USA: third and fourth season title)
... a.k.a. Uncovered (syndication title)
It's Only Mink (1959) TV Episode .... Fat Lady
Hancock's Half Hour (3 episodes, 1957–1959) The Big Night (1959) TV Episode
"The Russian Prince" (1957) TV Episode (as Anne Lancaster) .... Russian Aristocrat
"Lady Chatterley's Revenge" (1957) TV Episode .... Cynthia – Actress
"Tea at the Ritz" (1963) (TV) .... Rene Barnes ... a.k.a. Comedy Four: Tea at the Ritz (UK: series title)
Comedy Playhouse ....(1 episode, 1963)
"The Chars" (1963) TV Episode .... Amanda
An Enemy of the State (1965) (mini) TV Series .... Grusha
The Wednesday Play Up the Junction (1965) TV Episode .... Winnie
Out of the Unknown ....(1 episode, 1965)
"Come Buttercup, Come Daisy, Come...?" (1965) TV Episode .... Mrs. Bryant
The Spies .... (1 episode, 1966) .... Dora
No Strings (1967) (TV)
Z-Cars .... (3 episodes, 1963–1967)
"Family Affair: Part 2" (1967) TV Episode .... Annie Ramsbottom
"Running Milligan" (1963) TV Episode .... Milly
"Train of Events" (1963) TV Episode .... Geraldine
Till Death Us Do Part (1 episode, 'Aunt Maud', 1968) .... Maud 
Please Sir! (2 episodes, 1968) .... Mrs. Pearce
 Best of Enemies (1 episode, 1968) .... Mrs. Ewing
Thirty-Minute Theatre (1 episode, 1969)
Someone's Knocking at Me Door (1969) TV Episode .... Mollie Thompson 
The World of Beachcomber (unknown episodes, 1969) TV Series .... Various 
Barry Humphries' Scandals (1 episode, 1970)
Father, Dear Father .... Bookshop Customer (1 episode, 1970)
"The Suitable Suitor" (1970) TV Episode .... Bookshop Customer

References

External links
 

1920 births
1970 deaths
English television actresses
English film actresses
20th-century English actresses
Deaths from cancer in England
20th-century British businesspeople